The 1966 San Francisco Giants season was the Giants' 84th year in Major League Baseball, their ninth year in San Francisco since their move from New York following the 1957 season, and their seventh at Candlestick Park. The Giants finished second in the National League with a record of 93 wins and 68 losses, a game-and-a-half behind their arch-rivals, the NL champion Los Angeles Dodgers.

Offseason 
 October 15, 1965: Warren Spahn was released by the Giants.
 December 2, 1965: Randy Hundley and Bill Hands traded to the Chicago Cubs for Lindy McDaniel and Don Landrum.

Regular season

Season standings

Record vs. opponents

Opening Day lineup 
Jesús Alou
Tito Fuentes
Len Gabrielson
Tom Haller
Jim Ray Hart
Hal Lanier
Juan Marichal
Willie Mays
Willie McCovey

Notable transactions 
 May 8, 1966: Orlando Cepeda was traded by the Giants to the St. Louis Cardinals for Ray Sadecki.
 June 10, 1966: Bob Shaw was purchased from the Giants by the New York Mets.

Game log and schedule

|-  style="text-align:center; background:#fbb;"
| 13 || April 25 || Braves
|-  style="text-align:center; background:#fbb;"
| 14 || April 26 || Braves
|-

|-  style="text-align:center; background:#bfb;"
| 47 || June 1 || @ Braves
|-  style="text-align:center; background:#bfb;"
| 48 || June 2 || @ Braves
|-  style="text-align:center; background:#bfb;"
| 76 || June 30 || Braves
|-

|-  style="text-align:center; background:#bfb;"
| 77 || July 1 || Braves
|-  style="text-align:center; background:#fbb;"
| 78 || July 2 || Braves
|-  style="text-align:center; background:#fbb;"
| 79 || July 3 || Braves
|-  style="text-align:center; background:#fbb;"
| 102 || July 29 || @ Braves
|-  style="text-align:center; background:#fbb;"
| 103 || July 30 || @ Braves
|-  style="text-align:center; background:#fbb;"
| 104 || July 30 || @ Braves
|-  style="text-align:center; background:#bfb;"
| 105 || July 31 || @ Braves
|-

|-  style="text-align:center; background:#fbb;"
| 122 || August 19 || Braves
|-  style="text-align:center; background:#bfb;"
| 123 || August 20 || Braves
|-  style="text-align:center; background:#bfb;"
| 124 || August 21 || Braves
|-

|-  style="text-align:center; background:#bfb;"
| 156 || September 26 || @ Braves
|-  style="text-align:center; background:#bfb;"
| 157 || September 27 || @ Braves
|-  style="text-align:center; background:#bfb;"
| 158 || September 28 || @ Braves
|-

Roster

Player stats

Batting

Starters by position 
Note: Pos = Position; G = Games played; AB = At bats; H = Hits; Avg. = Batting average; HR = Home runs; RBI = Runs batted in

Other batters 
Note: G = Games played; AB = At bats; H = Hits; Avg. = Batting average; HR = Home runs; RBI = Runs batted in

Pitching

Starting pitchers 
Note: G = Games pitched; IP = Innings pitched; W = Wins; L = Losses; ERA = Earned run average; SO = Strikeouts

Other pitchers 
Note: G = Games pitched; IP = Innings pitched; W = Wins; L = Losses; ERA = Earned run average; SO = Strikeouts

Relief pitchers 
Note: G = Games pitched; W = Wins; L = Losses; SV = Saves; ERA = Earned run average; SO = Strikeouts

Awards and honors 

All-Star Game

Farm system

Notes

References 
1966 San Francisco Giants at Baseball Reference
1966 San Francisco Giants at Baseball Almanac

San Francisco Giants seasons
San Francisco Giants season
1966 in sports in California
1966 in San Francisco